Pirate havens are ports or harbors that are a safe place for pirates to repair their vessels, resupply, recruit, spend their plunder, avoid capture, and/or lie in wait for merchant ships to pass by. The areas have governments that are unable or unwilling to enforce maritime laws. This creates favorable conditions for piracy.

These havens were often near maritime shipping lanes. Although some havens were merely hidden coves, some were established by governments who employed privateers to disrupt the overseas trade of rival nations.

Some historic pirate havens included Barataria Bay, Port Royal, and Tortuga. These provided some autonomy for privateers and buccaneers.

Barbary Coast
Historically, the Barbary Coast contained a number of pirate havens, notably Salé, Algiers and Tunis. These pirate havens were used by corsairs from the 16th to the 19th century. The pirates, dubbed "Barbary Pirates", ravaged European shipping and enslaved thousands of captives. The Pirate Republic of Salé, in 17th century Morocco, was a micronation with its own seaport argot known as "Franco," since like other pirate states, it from time to time made treaties with European governments, agreeing not to attack their fleets.

Mehdya (La Mamora) in Morocco was a pirate haven in the early 17th century. Another notable base for Barbary corsairs was Ghar al Milh (Porto Farina) in Tunisia.

The United States Navy was founded, in part, to counter the activities of the Barbary pirates, and the United States fought the First and Second Barbary Wars (1801–1805, 1815) to end this threat to its shipping.

Ireland
In the early 17th century in Munster (Ireland's southernmost province), Leamcon (near Schull) was a pirate stronghold, while pirates traded easily in nearby Baltimore and Whiddy Island. Munster's coast provided favorable geography in the form of harbors, bays, islands, anchorages and headlands, while the province's remoteness made it difficult to control from London or Dublin. Literate pirates in Ireland could, till 1613, escape secular trial (making their prosecution much more difficult) by pleading "benefit of clergy". The coast of Munster complemented Mehdya as a base for piracy since, during summers, Mehdya became less safe as the calmer waters favored the galleys used to suppress piracy.

Madagascar
One of the earliest rumored places where pirates collected was on the island of Madagascar, off the East coast of Africa. This was their base of operations for their pecking of the Mughal Empire. Here they could prey on the successes of the East India Companies while being a world away from any authority. These are the same outlaws that were plundering the West Indies. The English pirate Henry Every plundered a Mughal ship, gaining immense wealth. Every was said to have settled on Madagascar and was never heard from again, though it was rumored he retired in Ireland. Some writers speculate that this event put in motion a series of events that would help lead to the multitude of laws passed for decades to come.

Madagascan pirate havens included Fort-Dauphin, the town of Saint Augustin and the Île Sainte-Marie.

Somali Coast
In the early 2000s, piracy off the coast of Somalia became commonplace. During this period, pirate havens included Eyl, in the Puntland region of northern Somalia, and Harardhere (Xarard-heere), in the Mudug province of Somalia. During this same time period, the Transitional Federal Government of Somalia was believed to be unable to enforce maritime laws. Other modern havens included Garaad and Hobyo in central Somalia.

List of examples
Barataria Bay in the United States
Campeche in Mexico
Crete in Greece
Harardhere in Somalia
Visby in Gotland, Sweden
See Victual Brothers

Caribbean
Matanzas in Cuba
Republic of Pirates (New Providence) in the Bahamas
Port Royal in Jamaica
Saint Thomas in the U.S. Virgin Islands
Tortuga in Haiti
Virgin Gorda in the British Virgin Islands

Purported
Libertatia

Pirate utopias

The American anarchist Peter Lamborn Wilson identified pirate societies as being spaces temporarily outside of the control of states, and consequently proto-anarchist societies. This forms part of his thesis of Temporary Autonomous Zones, spaces or polities in which anarchist conceptions of freedom were briefly enacted during various historical periods.

See also
Tax haven

Notes

References
Peter Lamborn Wilson, Pirate Utopias: Moorish Corsairs & European Renegadoes  (Autonomedia, 1996)
Peter Ludlow, Crypto Anarchy, Cyberstates, and Pirate Utopias  (2001)
Hakim Bey, TAZ - The Temporary Autonomous Zone, Ontological Anarchy, Poetic Terrorism  (Autonomedia, 2003)
Hannu Pesonen, Somalian merirosvot kukistuvat kuten kaikki edeltäjänsä Tiede (Finnish science magazine) no. 5/2011, pp. 44–49 (Sanoma magazines, 2011)

 
Barbary Wars
Political philosophy
Social philosophy

es:Utopía pirata